Cote Blanche is a place located in St. Mary parish, Louisiana, United States. It is an "island" or an elevated mound rising about 25 meters above the surrounding Holocene coastal marshes at the shore of West Cote Blanche Bay, which in turn opens onto the Gulf of Mexico. Its name comes from the French Côte Blanche, meaning "White Coast."

Cote Blanche has important salt domes that are mined by North American Salt Company, a subsidiary of Compass Minerals International. The Cote Blanche mine produces about 9 tons of salt every minute.

Islands of Louisiana
Landforms of St. Mary Parish, Louisiana